Talia Radan (born 9 May 1988) is an Australian rules footballer playing for  in the AFL Women's competition. She was drafted by Adelaide with their eighth selection and fifty-eighth overall in the 2016 AFL Women's draft. She made her debut in the thirty-six point win against Greater Western Sydney at Thebarton Oval in the opening round of the 2017 season. She was a part of Adelaide's premiership side after the club defeated Brisbane by six points at Metricon Stadium in the AFL Women's Grand Final. She played every match in her debut season to finish with eight matches.

Adelaide signed Radan for the 2018 season during the trade period in May 2017.

Ahead of the 2019 season, Radan was traded to Melbourne as part of a 5-way deal, including Christina Bernardi and 12 picks.

Talia studied Law and Social Science at the University of Adelaide before moving to Canberra. Talia did her Graduate Diploma in Legal Practice with the Australian National University before moving to work for the Federal Government.

References

External links 

1988 births
Living people
Adelaide Football Club (AFLW) players
Australian rules footballers from the Australian Capital Territory
University of Adelaide alumni
Australian National University alumni
West Coast Eagles (AFLW) players